Patrice Fontanarosa (born 4 September 1942 in Paris) is a French classical violinist and actor.

Early life 
Fontanarosa is the elder son of the painters Lucien Fontanarosa (1912-1975) and Annette Faive-Fontanarosa (1911-1988).

Education 
In 1959, Fontanarosa earned a music diploma with  first prize in violin from Conservatoire de Paris.

Career 
 Solo violin of I Virtuosi di Roma
 1976 to 1985, concertmaster of the Orchestre national de France
 Music director of the Orchestre des Pays de Savoie when it was created in 1984
 Violinist of the Fontanarosa

Fontanarosa formed the famous Fontanarosa Trio with his sister Frédérique Fontanarosa, pianist, and their brother Renaud Fontanarosa, cellist.

Teaching 
 Academic at the Conservatoire de Paris
 Academic at the Schola Cantorum de Paris

International prizes and awards 
 Villa Lobos in Rio de Janeiro
 Enesco in Bucarest
 Kreisler in Liège
 1965: 6th prize of the Long-Thibaud-Crespin Competition in Paris
 Ginette Neveu competition in Paris
 1967: 3rd prize of the Paganini Competition in Genoa
 1995: Victoire de la musique; best Instrumental soloist for the CD Le Violon de l'Opéra

Actor 
Cinema
 1971: Jo by Jean Girault as the violinist

Television
 1975:  by

Personal life 
Fontanarosa is married to harpist Marielle Nordmann.

References

External links 
 Official website
 Patrice Fontanarosa's discography on Discogs 
 Patrice Fontanarosa president of the Dominique Peccatte competition jury
 Patrice Fontanarosa on France Musique
 Patrice Fontanarosa "Partita en mi" de Johann Sebastian Bach (YouTube)

1942 births
Living people
Musicians from Paris
20th-century French male classical violinists
Academic staff of the Conservatoire de Paris
Academic staff of the École Normale de Musique de Paris